A referendum on "the protection of national unity" was held in Egypt on 10 February 1977. It was approved by 99.4% of voters, with a turnout of 96.7%.

Results

References

Egypt
Protection of national unity referendum
Referendums in Egypt
Egyptian protection of national unity referendum